The 86th Texas Legislature began on January 8, 2019, and adjourned four months later on May 27, 2019.

House of Representatives 
Members of the Texas House of Representatives for the 86th Texas Legislature were elected in the 2018 Texas House of Representatives election.

Senate 
Members of the Texas Senate for the 86th Texas Legislature were elected in the 2016 Texas State Senate election and 2018 Texas State Senate election. The 31 Senators included 19 Republicans and 12 Democrats.

 https://ericwoomer.com/resources/a-recap-of-the-86th-texas-legislative-session
 https://www.texastribune.org/2019/12/27/2019-86th-texas-legislature/

References 

86 Texas Legislature
2019 in Texas
2019 U.S. legislative sessions